Sophia Regina Allison (born May 27, 1997), better known by her stage name Soccer Mommy, is an American singer-songwriter from Nashville, Tennessee.

History
Born in Zürich, Switzerland in 1997 to Michelle, an elementary school teacher, and John, a neuroscientist, Allison grew up in Nashville, Tennessee, where her parents moved when she was 2. She attended Nashville School of the Arts, a specialty high school where she studied guitar and played in the swing band.

She first began playing guitar at age six and started making music. She began posting home-recorded songs to Bandcamp as Soccer Mommy in 2015, during the summer when she was about to leave for college. She then attended New York University, where she studied music business at the Steinhardt School of Culture, Education, and Human Development. While in college, Allison played her first show as Soccer Mommy at the community art space Silent Barn in Bushwick, Brooklyn, and shortly after landed a record deal with Fat Possum. She dropped out of college after two years in 2017 to return to Nashville and pursue her music career.

Her first full-length album as Soccer Mommy, For Young Hearts, was released in 2016 on Orchid Tapes. Her second album, Collection, was released in 2017 on Fat Possum Records. Her debut album proper, titled Clean, was released on March 2, 2018.

She has toured with Stephen Malkmus, Mitski, Kacey Musgraves, Jay Som, Slowdive, Frankie Cosmos, Liz Phair, Phoebe Bridgers and others. She joined Paramore and Foster the People on the first half of their 2018 summer tour. Soccer Mommy opened for Vampire Weekend in the fall. She also opened for a few shows for Wilco in the fall of 2019. In February 2020, she played at one of Bernie Sanders's presidential rallies and endorsed his 2020 presidential campaign.

Influences
Allison cites musicians Natalie Imbruglia, Mitski, Slowdive, the Chicks, Taylor Swift and Avril Lavigne, as well as the cities of Nashville and New York, as influences. Lavigne's Under My Skin (2004) was the first CD she ever owned.

Allison has said that her music is influenced by pop music and she strives to include catchy elements in her songs.

Discography

Studio albums

Demo albums

Compilation albums

Extended plays

Singles

Notes

Awards and nominations

References

External sources

 
 
 
 
 Soccer Mommy at Fat Possum Records

1997 births
21st-century American guitarists
21st-century American singers
21st-century American women guitarists
21st-century American women singers
American pop musicians
American women singer-songwriters
Fat Possum Records artists
Guitarists from Tennessee
Living people
Loma Vista Recordings artists
Singer-songwriters from Tennessee
Singers from Nashville, Tennessee
Swiss emigrants to the United States